The Swindon Wildcats 2 are an amateur English ice hockey team based in Swindon, Wiltshire. The team is a development team for the Swindon Wildcats. The team currently plays in the NIHL 2 South West.

Club roster 2020–21

2020/21 Outgoing

References

Ice hockey teams in England
Sport in Swindon
1986 establishments in England
Ice hockey clubs established in 1986